Sarlak Sarlak is a 400-year old clan from the Haft lang branch of Bakhtiyari tribe, who originally have lived in eastern Khuzestan, Lorestan, and Isfahan provinces. Sarlak is also the name of a village in Zaz-e Sharqi Rural District, Zaz va Mahru District, Aligudarz County, Lorestan Province, Iran. At the 2006 census, its population was 111, in 22 families.

References 

Towns and villages in Aligudarz County